Uladzimir Karatkievich (26 November 1930 – 25 July 1984) was a Belarusian romantic writer.

Biography

Family and childhood
Karatkevich's ancestors were of aristocratic class and came from the Belarusian cities Dnieper, Rogachev, Mstislavl, Mogilev and others. One of the writer's maternal relatives, according to family legend - Thomas Hrynkevich, took part in the uprising of 1863. The rebels under his command were defeated, and he himself was shot in Rahačow. This story Korotkevitch described in the epilogue of the Russian-language novel "Background" (Предыстория), and in the prologue of the novel "Can not forget" ("Leonids will not return to the Earth", «Леониды не вернутся к Земле»).

He was born on November 26, 1930, in the city of Orsha, Vitebsk region, into a family of intellectuals. Father - Simon (1887 - 1959), graduated from City College in Orsha, he worked in the Treasury, served as a clerk in the imperial army, then worked as an inspector of the budget in the Orsha district finance department. Mother - Nadezhda Vasilevna (1893 - 1977), from the Hrynkevich family, after graduating from the Mariinsky Gymnasium in Mogilev, worked for some time as a teacher in a rural school near Rogachev, after marriage she took up housekeeping. The family had three children - Vladimir, his older brother, Valery (1918 - 1941), elder sister Natalia (married - Kuchkovskaya; 1922–2003). During his childhood, the family greatly influenced Vladimir. Especially influential was his maternal grandfather Basil Yullyanavich Hrynkevich (1861 - 1945), a man with rich life experience, who rose to the rank of provincial treasurer. Vasil Hrynkevich was a witty narrator, from whom his grandson heard many fairy tales and folk tales, inherited a love of nature. Later, the grandfather will be the prototype of Daniel Zagorskaga-Vezhy in the novel "Ears under your sickle" («Колосья под серпом твоим»). From his grandfather Vladimir heard the legend of the "Mother of the Wind" about the events of the Krichev uprising of 1743-1744. Many of the stories of his grandfather became a source for future works of Vladimir.

Vladimir learned to read very early, at the age of three and a half. As a child, he not only liked to listen to fairy tales and various stories that were read to him by his elders, but tried to think of plot development. From the earliest childhood he was interested in history, especially the history of Belarus. As a child, the diversity of his talents was manifested in a penchant for drawing, which lasted a lifetime. Also, he had perfect pitch, while engaged in a music school.

Young Karatkevich was also interested in theater, understood Yiddish, as evidenced by the memoirs of his older sister Natalia Kuchkovskaya: "Occasionally a Jewish theater came to our city. Since the Jewish language sounded at Orsha streets every day, we had no interpreter quietly watched the whole repertoire, consisting of well-known works of Sholem Aleichem: "Wandering Stars", "Teve-milkman", "Boy Motl" - and have more fun".

In 1938 he went to school in Orsha. By the beginning of the war he managed to finish 3 classes.

War period and later life 
During the Second World War his family was evacuated to Moscow, and then to Chkalov and Kyiv.

In 1954, he graduated from the Philological Department of Kyiv University and first taught in a village school in the Kyiv region of Ukraine, and then in his home town, Orsha (Belarus). Later, he completed advanced literature courses (1960) and cinematography (1962) in Moscow. Literature became his main occupation.

In Kyiv, Uladzimir Karatkevich continued to compose poems in Belarusian and Russian, and tried to write them in Ukrainian and Polish. In his student essays, several literary topics were thoroughly developed: the works of Pushkin, Bogdanovich and others. At this time he conceived a great historical work, where he planned to present all the circumstances of the uprising of 1863–1864. In the summer of 1950 in Orsha, after the first course of the Faculty of Philology, Korotkevich created the first version of the famous novel King Stakh's Wild Hunt.

Career
His first published work (a poem) was in 1951, which was followed by three collections of verses. Later, he turned to prose and subsequently published a large number of short stories in collections entitled Chazenia, The Eye of the Typhoon, From Past Ages, and others. He also wrote the novels Unforgettable and The Dark Castle Olshansky. The novel King Stakh's Wild Hunt (Дзікае паляванне караля Стаха, 1964) is probably his most popular work. His novels deal predominantly with Belarus's historical past, including the January uprising of 1863 – 1865.

Karatkievich also wrote a number of plays, essays, articles, screenplays for short and feature films, and detective and adventure stories. Karatkievich's literary works are marked by romanticism, rich imagery, and emotionalism. A recipient of several national literary awards, he has strongly affected the further development of historical themes in Belarusian literature.

Bibliography
This list is not full, you can see complete list of author's works in the article in Belarusian wiki.

Novels 
 Леаніды не вернуцца да Зямлі, 1960—1962
 Каласы пад сярпом тваім, 1962—1964
 Хрыстос прызямліўся ў Гародні, 1965—1966
 Чорны замак Альшанскі, 1979

Stories 
 Предыстория
 King Stakh's Wild Hunt (Дзікае паляванне караля Стаха), 1950—1958
 У снягах драмае вясна, 1957
 Цыганскі кароль, 1958
 Сівая легенда, 1960
 Зброя, 1964
 Ладдзя Роспачы, 1964
 Чазенія, 1966
 Лісце каштанаў, 1973
 Крыж Аняліна, 1988

References

Sources
 
 

1930 births
1984 deaths
People from Orsha
Belarusian writers
Romanticism
Taras Shevchenko National University of Kyiv alumni
Recipients of the Byelorussian SSR State Prize
Recipients of the Order of Friendship of Peoples